Hojjat Sedghi (born 7 February 1993), is an Iranian footballer who played as a goalkeeper for Sepahan in the Iran Pro League.

He was a member of Iran national under-20 and Iran national under-23 football teams.

Club career
Sedghi has played most his career with Mes Kerman. He made his debut for Mes Kerman while he used as a substitute against Zob Ahan in last fixture of 2011–12 Iran Pro League.

Club career statistics

International career

U20

He was part of Iran U–20 participating in 2012 AFC U-19 Championship. He was the first choice of Akbar Mohammadi in qualifiers, but benched during the championship.

U23
He invited to Iran U-23 training camp by Nelo Vingada to preparation for Incheon 2014 and 2016 AFC U-22 Championship (Summer Olympic qualification). He named in Iran U23 final list for Incheon 2014.

References

1993 births
Living people
People from Kerman
Iranian footballers
Sanat Mes Kerman F.C. players
Iran under-20 international footballers
Association football goalkeepers
Footballers at the 2014 Asian Games
People from Kerman Province
Asian Games competitors for Iran